P45 may refer to:

Vessels 
 , a corvette of the Argentine Navy
 , a submarine of the Royal Navy

Other uses 
 P45 (tax), a form designation used as a metonym for termination of employment
 Bell P-45, an American fighter aircraft later redesignated P-39C
 Intel P45, a computer chipset
 Mount Pleasant/Scottdale Airport, in Fayette County, Pennsylvania, United States
 P45 road (Ukraine)
 Papyrus 45, a biblical manuscript
 Pneumonoultramicroscopicsilicovolcanoconiosis, a synonym for the disease known as silicosis
 P45, a state regional road in Latvia
 P45, a digital camera back made by Phase One
 P45, a hybrid microcar made by Jeremy Clarkson on Top Gear

See also
 Ferrari P4/5 by Pininfarina, an Italian sports car